Submarine Command is a 1951 American war film directed by John Farrow and starring William Holden, Don Taylor, Nancy Olson, William Bendix, and Darryl Hickman. It is notable for being one of the first films to touch on post traumatic stress disorder. Holden invested $20,000 of his own money into the film.  The film received a mixed reception: it was panned by some critics for its brooding melodrama whilst being praised by others.

Plot
During the Pacific War, Lieutenant Commander Ken White orders the submarine USS Tiger Shark to crash dive to evade a Japanese aerial attack. Crewman Boyer begs him to wait for the captain, Commander Josh Rice, still topside, but White refuses, and Rice (his good friend) and the quartermaster are lost. When they resurface shortly afterward, they learn that the war is over. No one other than Boyer, not even the captain's widow and father, blames him.

White marries Carol and remains in the Navy after the war. Everything is fine, until one day he is assigned to show a reporter around who is doing a story about the Navy's mothball fleet. By chance, the submarine that catches the journalist's attention is the Tiger Shark. The newsman remembers the tragic story of the last day of the war and mentions that the officer who ordered the dive "must feel like a heel", and White's feelings of guilt resurface, straining his marriage. Then Boyer is assigned to his unit. When Boyer sees White, he immediately requests a transfer. As it happens, the Tiger Shark is being recommissioned, so White sends him there. A fire breaks out on the submarine, trapping a man in a compartment. Boyer wants to charge in to his rescue, but White makes him go "by the book" and put on a protective suit first, fueling Boyer's hatred.

White is about to resign from the Navy to escape the ghosts of his past, but changes his mind at the last moment. As a result, Carol decides to leave him. North Korea invades South Korea the same day, starting the Korean War. White is given command of the Tiger Shark. He sets sail from the Mare Island Naval Shipyard for the war as soon as the submarine is ready. Boyer is a disgruntled member of the crew.

When they rendezvous with an aircraft carrier, White is given a special mission. A colonel and his special intelligence unit are in possession of vital information, but are prisoners of war. A rescue mission is being mounted; White's job is to land men at two points to knock out enemy coastal installations in advance of a paratrooper airborne assault on the prison camp. White's part of the raid is led by Commander Peter Morris, a family friend. However, after dropping off Morris's unit first, one of the Tiger Shark engines begins overheating, endangering the timing of the second landing. To make up lost time, White makes the risky decision to enter the mined harbor. Once he sees the signal that the mission has been successful, he surfaces in order to notify his admiral, even though that exposes the submarine to fire from shore batteries. When the Tiger Shark is hit and starts sinking, White orders the crew to abandon ship. He and his men are picked up along with the freed prisoners.

His demons finally exorcised, he later attends the launching of another Tiger Shark with his wife, their baby and Boyer.

Cast
 William Holden as Cmdr. Ken White
 Nancy Olson as Carol
 William Bendix as CPO Boyer
 Don Taylor as Lt. Cmdr. Peter Morris
 Arthur Franz as Lt. Arnie Carlson
 Darryl Hickman as Ens. Jack Wheelwright
 Peggy Webber as Mrs. Alice Rice
 Moroni Olsen as Rear Adm. Joshua Rice
 Jack Gregson as Cmdr. Joshua Rice
 Jack Kelly as Lt. Paul Barton
 Don Dunning as Quartermaster Perkins
 Jerry Paris as Sgt. Gentry
 Charles Meredith as Adm. Tobias
 Philip Van Zandt as Gavin
 Gordon Polk as Ralph

Production
No ship of the United States Navy has ever borne the name USS Tiger Shark or Tigershark, but the name is popular for fictional submarines (and real submarines have been named USS Shark). , a Balao-class submarine, was the stand-in for Tiger Shark. The loss of a commanding officer on the bridge of a submarine was similar to the death of Commander Howard W. Gilmore on  during the war.

Radio adaptation
Submarine Command was presented on Lux Radio Theatre November 17, 1952. The one-hour adaptation starred Holden and Alexis Smith.

Comic book adaptation
 Eastern Color Movie Love #12 (December 1951)

References

External links
 
 
 
 
 

1951 films
1951 war films
American black-and-white films
Films directed by John Farrow
Films scored by David Buttolph
Films set in the San Francisco Bay Area
Korean War films
World War II submarine films
Paramount Pictures films
Films adapted into comics
American war films
1950s English-language films
Pacific War films
1950s American films